The Esztergom Synagogue is a building located in the town of Esztergom, Hungary. It was built in 1859, renovated in 1888, and severely damaged by a bombing during World War II. Since almost all Jewish people in the town were deported during the Holocaust and Communists subsequently gained control of the country, it has not been used for religious purposes since the 1940s.

Contemporary historian János Németh wrote that the synagogue continued to deteriorate until 1962, when the city council bought it from the National Office of the Hungarian Israelites. It was later rebuilt and inaugurated as the House of Technology on September 28th, 1964. However, another source states that in 1981 it became the House of Technology after repair work was done between 1980 and 1981 that "involved a strong simplification of the exterior" and "a complete transformation of the interior."

Per Németh's account, many government members and skilled volunteers worked to rebuild Esztergom Synagogue between 1963 and 1964. On September 28th, 1964, it was inaugurated as the House of Technology and became the home of the city's Organization of Technical and Natural Science Associations (MTESZ), which was founded on the same day.

In 2006, it was bought by the municipality and now hosts a variety of cultural institutions and events.

History 
Esztergom had been home to a large number of Jewish communities since the Árpád dynasty period. There are references to a synagogue dating back to circa 1050.

During the Reformation, Esztergom welcomed Jewish merchants and craftsmen, who built a synagogue there.  In 1858, another temple was erected on the site of today's synagogue in the former village of Szenttamás.

About thirty years later, a colleague of architect Ödön Lechner, Lipót Baumhorn, was commissioned to design a new synagogue; it was Baumhorn's first solo work. The synagogue was designed in the style of the Late-Romantic Period and was originally single-story with a gallery for the women of the congregation. It was inaugurated in 1888 by Ignác Weisz, the Rabbi of Esztergom, and Immánuel Lőw, the Rabbi of Szeged.

Until World War II, it was frequented by the Jews of Esztergom and the surrounding villages. During World War II, the synagogue was bombed and badly damaged. Approximately five hundred Jewish people were deported, and have not had a significant community in the city since. Since then, only the name  (lit. "Meetinghouse street") is a reminder of the original purpose of the building.

Contemporary historian János Németh stated that the synagogue continued to deteriorate until 1962, when the city council bought it from the National Office of the Hungarian Israelites. It was subsequently rebuilt and inaugurated as the House of Technology on September 28th, 1964.

Per his account, multiple parts of the government and skilled volunteers worked to rebuild it between 1963 and 1964, and on September 28th of 1964, it was inaugurated as the House of Technology (Hungarian Technika Háza), and became the home of the city's Organization of Technical and Natural Science Associations (MTESZ), which was founded on the same day.

Over the next few years, the organization continuously renovated and completely restructured the space to be able to hold conferences and lectures. It created lecture rooms, interpreting booths, rooms suitable for receptions, and district heating has been introduced. In 1996, the roof and dome shells were renovated. 

Several prestigious events took place between the walls of the synagogue. Politicians often gave lectures here on their tours. In 2006, the municipality bought the House of Technology for 70 million HUF. After that, the office of the Ister-Granum Euroregion operated there for a short time, until in 2008 it moved to the building of the County Hall of Bottyán János Street.

In 2014, Hungary's Neo-Nazi political party booked the Synagogue for a political rally. Citizens of Esztergom were enraged at the disrespect towards the Jewish community and asked the government to cancel the event.

Description 
The two-story monument synagogue is 1,216 square meters high and contains two tower units that jut out from both sides of the façade. These are connected by a triple-arched, arcade foyer. The original 1888 marble staircase leads to a conference room upstairs with interpreting booths.

The Martyr Monument in front of the building was erected according to the plans of István Martsa in 1985. The original 2.5-meter bronze work was made for the monument competition in Mauthausen and was placed in the Hungarian barracks of the Auschwitz camp museum. Its pedestal is a bonfire made of railway sleepers. A plaque commemorates the abductees on the wall of the building.

Further reading 
 Építészfórum - Az esztergomi zsinagóga újjáéledése  (English title: Architects' Forum - The revival of the Esztergom synagogue)
 Pifkó Péter – Zachar Anna:Esztergom helytörténeti kronológiája a kezdetektől 1950-ig (English title: Péter Pifkó - Anna Zachar: The local history chronology of Esztergom from the beginning to 1950)
 Komárom-Esztergom megye műemlékjegyzéke (2006) (English title: List of monuments of Komárom-Esztergom county (2006))
 Esztergom 2000 enciklopédia
 Annales Strigonienses 1994, 145. o.
 
 Budapest Beacon - Jobbik books synagogue for Valentine’s day political rally

References

External links

19th-century synagogues
Jewish Hungarian history
Buildings and structures in Esztergom
Synagogues in Hungary
Moorish Revival synagogues